Chorin is the surname of:

 Aaron Chorin (1766–1844), Hungarian rabbi and religious reformer
 Alexandre Chorin (born 1938), American mathematician
 Ethan Chorin (born 1968), American Middle East and Africa-focused scholar and entrepreneur
 Ferenc Chorin (1842–1925), Hungarian politician